The Institute for Social Movements, Pakistan (ISM) (Sindhi: انسٽيٽيوٽ فار سوشل موومينٽس پاڪستان | Urdu: ﺍﻧﺴﭩﻴﭩﻮﭦ ﻓﺎﺭ ﺳﻮ ﺷﻞ ﻣﻮﻭﻣﻴﻨﭧ ﭘﺎﻛﺴﺘﺎﻥ | Hindi: सामाजिक आंदोलनों के लिए संस्थान) was first of its kind of institution in Sindh, Pakistan that clubbed together social movements studies, activism and research . Established by prominent activists, journalists, development professionals and academicians from across Sindh, ISM was primarily active in almost all districts of Sindh and Sindh bordering districts of Balochistan. The Institute was established in Hyderabad in March 2010 after several deliberations held in Karachi, Hyderabad, Umerkot and Sukkur; however due to its important role in supporting civil, political, minorities and land rights in Sindh and Balochistan, ISM was involuntarily closed down on the pressure and threats by Pakistan Army associated intelligence agencies ISI and Military Intelligence on May 29, 2012. The founding directors of the ISM Zulfiqar Shah and his wife Fatima Shah were persecuted, harassed and threatened to death, and were asked to leave Pakistan, who left the country on May 30, 2012 and sought asylum with UNHCR in Nepal, which was granted to them.

ISM played an important role along with other civil society organizations in the Indus River Floods in Sindh by supporting flood victims and internally displaced persons (IDPs) and advocating IDPs rights in Sindh, however, the organization had a prominent recent past in the substantive democratic initiatives and rights activism around political, minorities', peasants and women rights in Sindh.

The organization was led by its founding executive director Zulfiqar Shah.

Democratic rights
ISM played a leading role in land rights movement in Sindh and Balochistan in 2010-11; movement against religious extremism in 2011 as well as political and civil rights in Sindh. It also was the leading forum vocal for the rights of disaster victims in Sindh.

Besides rights activism as well as mobilization and consultative process over XVIII Constitutional Amendment, ISM is a joint petitioner of a constitutional petition along with pro democracy individuals, civil society and political leaders and national level civil society organizations in the supreme court of Pakistan.

Role in the flood emergency response
ISM facilitated relief particularly medical support in 12 flood affected districts of Sindh and some parts of Baluchistan.  It was also working on IDP rights, facilitating joint forums over disaster management and IDPs issues in Sindh and issue concerning education and IDPs education concerns, with the organizing consultative and coordinative forums over the issues.

Indus Flood Relief Fund

HIMAL Southasian, a well reputed analytical magazine and The South Asian Trust, Nepal established Indus Flood Relief Fund to support the flood victims in Pakistan. This Initiative was joined by the South Asian Alliance for Poverty Eradication (SAAPE)
and NGO Federation of Nepal. The funds generated from the initiatives were decided to be administered by The Institute for Social Movements, Pakistan.

Vision and philosophy
ISM’s vision is to create favorable environment for socio-economically and culturally liberated and empowered man, women, children, youth, religious and ethnic minorities and vulnerable classes.  ISM is first kind of civil society organization in Pakistan that is having clearly identifies philosophical bases, which are as follows.

1.	In the context of the socio-economic and political realities of the country as well as development initiatives by the civil society organizations in Pakistan, we are of the opinion that unless rights agenda led by people’s movements around rights and the issues contributing to the collectivism and interestedness in development initiatives based on the basic values of liberties and liberations of individuals and of collectives in the social, economic and cultural realms is not made a core strategy of development in the country, it will become almost impossible to achieve the destiny of the socially, economic and culturally liberated and empowered man, women, children, youth, religious and ethnic minorities and vulnerable classes.

2.	The economic self-reliance and livelihood security combined with right based initiatives are the essential tiers of the development outlook required by Sindh, Pakistan, South Asia and rest of the world.

3.	A democracy in which people are not elevated enough to reach the stage of ‘the governance by the people’ is never considered a true democracy.

4.	Justice and Peace are foundation values of a truly free human society. Any initiative for the development and socio-economic uplift of the people does not favor as well as promote these values will prove to be retrogressive in the context of social development.

5.	Diversity in all of its forms is the beauty of modern social web emerged through modern human and industrial development.

6.	Humanity and all other forms of life have equal right over what is offered by nature on the globe. Being a higher form of consciousness, human is more responsible to earth and all forms of life over it.

7.	The initiatives by state or non state actors that contradict or devoid of the essential rights of freedoms agreed under various charters of United Nations to various classes, nations and ethnicities, cultural groups, religions and sects, minorities and genders are considered to be against the core values of a just and true spirit of democracy.

8.	A healthier political discourse and culture is necessary for the development, democracy and peace.

9.	Spiritually rich and elevated individuals are the foundation for socially and culturally rich human society.

10.	Non-violence is core value of actions and initiatives for the human development.

References

External links 
 Official Website of The Institute for Social Movements, Pakistan
 ISM Blog

Social movements in Pakistan
Hyderabad District, Pakistan
Organisations based in Sindh
Research institutes established in 2010
Research institutes in Pakistan
2010 establishments in Pakistan